Moody Radio is one of the largest Christian radio networks in the United States. Located in downtown Chicago, Moody Radio has 71 owned and operated stations  and hundreds of affiliates and outlets that carry all or part of its programming. It is owned by the Moody Bible Institute.

The network airs a variety of programming directed primarily toward a Christian audience. The format features local morning drives, teaching and national talk programming, plus specially selected Christian music.

History 
WMBI, the flagship station of Moody Radio, got its start seemingly by accident. A violent storm in October 1925 prevented the talent for WGES scheduled broadcast from performing on the radio. This opened the door for two cornet-playing Moody Bible Institute students, who happened to be on-site and could fill the time slot. Few would have thought this "chance-encounter" would result in a weekly show and less than a year later help to launch WMBI, the first noncommercial educational and religious radio station. Despite changing technology, audiences and formats, the station maintained a familiar presence on the air for over eight decades.

This station was just the beginning of what would come to be known as Moody Radio. In 1958, MBI purchased WCRF in Cleveland, Ohio, and shortly thereafter, WDLM in Moline, Illinois. These purchases were the catalyst for a network that would grow to include 36 stations in the continental U.S. By the end of the 1960s, the network’s potential audience had increased to 30 million listeners. In 1982, Moody Radio began a satellite-fed network enabling communications across America.

In 2019, Moody Radio put three of its AM stations up for sale. The company announced that the proceeds from the sale would be put towards furthering the expansion of Moody Radio with added digital and online content in both English and Spanish.

Programs 
Moody Radio provides biblical programming 24 hours a day. Some of the most popular and award-winning programs include: Equipped with Chris Brooks, Chris Fabry Live!, In the Market with Janet Parshall, and Open Line with Dr. Michael Rydelnik. From 11pm CT until 5am CT, Music Thru the Night is broadcast. From 1982 until his retirement in 2014, Mike Kellogg hosted the program. It is currently hosted by Bill Maier.

Owned & operated stations
The following stations are owned and operated by Moody Radio.

Full-powered stations

Notes:

Translators

References

External links 
 Moody Radio Official Site

 
American radio networks
Christian mass media companies
Christian radio stations in the United States
Radio broadcasting companies of the United States
Companies based in Chicago
Radio stations established in 1925